This page lists the rosters, by season, of the UCI Women's Team, Lotto–Soudal Ladies.

2012

Ages as of 1 January 2012.

2011

2010

Ages as of 1 January 2010.

2007

Kim Schoonbaert (BEL)
Elise Depoorter (BEL)
Liesbet De Vocht (BEL)
Catherine Delfosse (BEL) (in from Team Massi Abarth (MTB))
Lieselot Decroix (BEL) (in from Velo Bella)
Martine Bras (NED) (in from Moving Ladies)
Corine Hierckens (BEL) (in from AA Drink)
Grace Verbeken (BEL)
Sara Carrigan (AUS)
Siobhan Dervan (IRL)
Tamara Boyd (NZL) (in from Les Pruneaux d'Agen)
Yolandi Du Toit (RSA) (in from Team FBUK)
Kathy Watt (AUS)
Sofie De Vuyst (BEL)
Jurrina Duprez (BEL)
Annelies Van Doorslaer (BEL)
Laura Van Geyt (BEL)
Nana Steenssens (NED)
Ine Beyen (BEL)
Lien Beyen (BEL)
Denise D'Hamecourt (BEL)
Jenifer De Merlier (BEL)
Kelly Druyts (BEL)
Evi Verstraete (BEL)
Lien Lanssens (BEL)
Arien Torsius (RSA)
Natalia Llaca (MEX)

2006

  Marielle Aunave 
  Claire Baxter   
  Liesbet De Vocht   
  Sofie De Vuyst
  Ludivine Henrion    
  Siobhan Horgan   
  Myriam Jacotey 
  Christa Pirard   
  Kim Schoonbaert   
  Inge Van Den Broeck   
  An Van Rie   
  Christine Verdaros   
  Grace Verbeke   
  Kathryn Watt  
Source

References

Lists of cyclists by team